John Smith (born March 27, 1973) is a former American politician of the Republican Party. He was a member of the Washington State Senate from the 7th Legislative District. Smith was appointed to fill the Senate seat on January 3, 2013 following veteran Senator Bob Morton's retirement. He lost his seat in the November 5, 2013 election to Ferry County Commissioner Brian Dansel.

References

Republican Party Washington (state) state senators
Living people
1973 births